Tonne or Tønne may refer to the following people:

Given name
Tønne Huitfeldt (1625–1677), Norwegian military officer and landowner

Surname
Erik Tønne (born 1991), Norwegian footballer
Estas Tonne (born 1975), Ukrainian guitarist 
 Grant Hendrik Tonne (born 1976), German politician
Kåre Tønne, mayor of Trondheim
Lisa Tønne, Norwegian comedian
Tore Tønne, Norwegian politician
Wolfgang Tonne, German World War II fighter pilot
Wulfhilda Tonne, character from Strike Witches

See also

Notes

Norwegian masculine given names